Holter Ford Graham (born February 11, 1972) is an American actor and voice actor and the son of historian Hugh Davis Graham. He appeared in his first film, Stephen King’s Maximum Overdrive, at age thirteen.  He is best known for his film work in the original John Waters’s Hairspray; the Oscar-nominated Fly Away Home; Six Ways to Sunday; Spin the Bottle; and Offspring, as well as his television work on Damages, Rescue Me, Law & Order, Army Wives, and New York Undercover. From 2008–2010, Graham was the co-host of Planet Green’s, Wasted.  Since 2000, he has been the voice of HBO, and has narrated over 150 audio books, winning dozens of awards for his work.

Graham has a Bachelor of Arts and Master of Fine Arts in Creative Writing, and is a certified auto and motorcycle mechanic. He is a serving officer in the performer’s and broadcaster’s union SAG-AFTRA, over the years holding positions of Local and National Board Member, National Vice President, Local Vice President and Local President for New York. He was a member of the G1, the bi-union group that designed the AFTRA and SAG merger of 2012.

Graham’s wife is his college sweetheart, the award-winning author, professor, and education activist Neela Vaswani.  In 2010, he was diagnosed with acute lymphoblastic leukemia and had a successful bone marrow transplant.

Awards 
Audie Award, Audiobook of the Year, The Only Plane in the Sky: An Oral History of 9/11
Audiofile magazine Earphone Award, Alone
Audiofile magazine Earphone Award, House on Fire, Nick Heller Book 4
Audiofile magazine Earphone Award, Beneath the Bonfire
Audiofile magazine Earphone Award, Dragonsworn, Dark Hunter Book 28
AudioFile Best of 2012 Fiction, Canada
AudioFile Best of 2012 Fiction, The Art of Fielding
AudioFile Best of 2009 Mystery & Suspense, Vanished
AudioFile Best of 2008 Fantasy, Acheron
AudioFile Best of 2008 Fiction, The Resurrectionist

Filmography

Films
Small Time (2020) – Rick
Joy Ride (2017) – Rick
Offspring (2009) – Manetti
Resurrection, Glen Canyon and a New Vision for the American West (2009) – Narrator
The Diversion (2005) – Driver
The Acting Class (2000) – Self
Trifling with Fate (2000) – David
Spin the Bottle (2000) – Jonah
The Curse (1999) – Spencer
Six Ways to Sunday (1997) – Madden
Fly Away Home (1996) – Barry Stickland
Cry-Baby (1990) – Strip Poker No. 2
Two Evil Eyes (1990) – Christian (as Holter Ford Graham)
Hairspray (1988) – I.Q. Jones
Maximum Overdrive (1986) – Deke Keller

Television
Wa$ted! (2008 to 2010) – Co-host
Army Wives
"Onward Christian Soldier" (2009) – Coach Don Whitty
"Disengagement" (2009) – Coach Don Whitty
Damages
"Hey! Mr. Pibb!" (2009) – Bartender
As the World Turns
"Episode #1.13186" (2008) – Manny
Rescue Me
"Retards" (2006) – Bartender
Thrill Zone
"Arctic Void" (2005) – Narrator
New York Undercover
"Smack Is Back" (1996) – Donnie
Law & Order
"Guardian" (1995) – Erik Hanson
Swans Crossing
 "Episode #1.31" (1992) TV episode – Billy Gunn
 "Episode #1.44" (1992) TV episode – Billy Gunn
 "Episode #1.45" (1992) TV episode – Billy Gunn
 "Episode #1.46" (1992) TV episode – Billy Gunn

Video games
Red Dead Redemption 2 (2018) – Skinners Gang
Grand Theft Auto V (2013) – The Local Population
Star Wars: The Old Republic (2011) – Major Khourlet
Red Dead Redemption (2010) – Sam Odessa, Drunk Man
Manhunt 2 (2007) – Leo Kasper
Grand Theft Auto: Liberty City Stories (2005) – Bikers, Forellis (Uncredited)
The Warriors (2005) – Vance, Tracer, Goober, Bull, Gus
CT Special Forces: Fire for Effect (2005) – Stealth Owl

Audiobooks
In this section, the date of publication of the audiobook, not the original work, is shown.
 The Only Plane in the Sky: an Oral History of 9/11 (2019)
 Permanent Record (2019)
 Fire and Fury: Inside the Trump White House (2018)
 "Nevernight: The Nevernight Chronicle, Book 1" (2017)
 Born on the Fourth of July (2016)
 The Revenant (2015)
 Instinct (Chronicles of Nick) (2015)
  Dragonbane (2015)
  The Highway (2013)
 Feature (2013)
 Flat Water Tuesday (2013)
 Long Shot (2013)
 The Bourne Imperative (2013)
 The Yellow Birds (2013)
 The Long Valley (2012)
 Canada (2012)
 500 Days: Secrets and Lies in the Terror Wars (2012)
 The End of Illness (2012)
 The Art of Fielding (2012)
 Inferno (Chronicles of Nick) (2012)
 Time Untime (Dark Hunger Book 21) (2012)
No Easy Day: The Firsthand Account of the Mission That Killed Osama Bin Laden (2012)
Satori (2012)
 Jack Kennedy: Elusive Hero (2011)
Back of Beyond (2011)
Infamous(Chronicles of Nick)(2012)
The Gentlemen's Hour: A Novel (2011)
 InVincible (Chronicles of Nick) (2011)
Halo: Cryptum (Forerunner Saga series) (2011)
Christine (2010)
Halo: Evolutions (2010)
No Mercy (Dark-Hunter series) (2010)
 Infinity (Chronicles of Nick) (2010)
UR (2010)
Hell's Kitchen (2009)
Hit Hard (2009)
The Last Light of the Sun (2009)
Vanished (2009)
Acheron (Dark-Hunter series) (2008)
The Bodies Left Behind (2008)
Dear John (2008)
High Crimes: The Fate of Everest in an Age of Greed (2008)
Island: Escape (2008)
Just After Sunset (2008) – the stories "Willa", "The Cat from Hell", and "N."
No Limits: The Will to Succeed (2008)
The Resurrectionist (2008)
War and Decision: Inside the Pentagon at the Dawn of the War on Terrorism (2008)
The Choice (2007)
The Fourth Order (2007)
Island: Shipwreck (2007)
Island: Survival (2007)
Schulz and Peanuts (2007)
Dragon Fire (2006)
The Husband (2006)
Rebound Rules (2006)
The Serial Killers Club  (2006)
Alibi: A Novel (2005)
The City of Falling Angels (2005)
One L (2005)
Visits from the Drowned Girl (2004)

Producer
The Diversion (2005)

Editor
The Diversion (2005)

References

External links
 

1972 births
Living people
Male actors from New York City
American male child actors
American editors
American male film actors
Film producers from New York (state)
American male television actors
American male voice actors
Male actors from Baltimore
Vermont College of Fine Arts alumni
Skidmore College alumni